Jean-Paul Rössinger is a Swiss retired slalom canoeist who competed from the early 1950s to the early 1960s. He won five medals at the ICF Canoe Slalom World Championships with three silvers (C-1 team: 1953; C-2 team: 1953, 1957) and two bronzes (C-2 team: 1951, 1961).

References

Swiss male canoeists
Possibly living people
Year of birth missing (living people)
Medalists at the ICF Canoe Slalom World Championships